Donald Sumpter (born 13 February 1943) is an English actor who has appeared in film and television since the mid-1960s.

Career
One of his early television appearances was the 1968 Doctor Who serial The Wheel in Space with Patrick Troughton as the Doctor. He appeared in Doctor Who again in the 1972 serial The Sea Devils with Jon Pertwee. He also appeared in the Doctor Who spin-off The Sarah Jane Adventures. In 2015 he appears as the Time Lord President Rassilon in "Hell Bent". 

His early film work included a lead role as real life criminal Donald Neilson in the 1977 film The Black Panther.

He also appeared in many television films and serials, including adaptations of Dickens' novels: Nicholas Nickleby in 2001, Great Expectations in 1999 and Bleak House in 1985. Also in 1985, he was remembered for the part of villain Ronnie Day in Big Deal. He played the part of suspected serial killer Alexander Bonaparte Cust in the (1992) Agatha Christie's Poirot episode, The ABC Murders. He has also appeared in episodes of Midsomer Murders, The Bill, Holby City, Black Mirror, and A Touch of Frost and Endeavour.  He also had a recurring role as Uncle Ginger in the Children's BBC series The Queen's Nose. He played Harold Chapple in Our Friends in the North, and portrayed the physicist Max Planck in Einstein and Eddington. He has also been seen as Kemp in the horror-drama series Being Human. In seasons 1 and 2, he portrayed Maester Luwin in the HBO series Game of Thrones.

His film appearances include The Constant Gardener (2005), K-19: The Widowmaker (2002), Enigma (2001) and Ultramarines: The Movie (2010).

Filmography

Films

Television

References

External links 

1943 births
English male film actors
English male television actors
Living people
Place of birth missing (living people)
21st-century British male actors
20th-century British male actors
English male stage actors
English male Shakespearean actors